The 2022 Benelux World RX of Spa-Francorchamps was the eighth and ninth round of the ninth season of the FIA World Rallycross Championship. The event was double-header (two races in a weekend) held at the Circuit de Barcelona-Catalunya in Montmeló, Catalonia. Johan Kristoffersson clinched his fifth FIA World Rallycross Championship crown – and the first of the series’ new electric era – at World RX of Catalunya (30 October).

World RX1e Championship Race 1 

Source

Heats

Progression 

 Race 1

 Race 2

Semi-finals 

 Semi-Final 1

 Semi-Final 2

 Note: Gustav Bergström progressed to the Final race as one of two placed trird Semi-Finals drivers with better result in Progression Round.

Final

World RX1e Championship Race 2 

Source

Heats

Progression 

 Race 1

 Race 2

Semi-finals 

 Semi-Final 1

 Semi-Final 2

 Note: Niclas Grönholm progressed to the Final race as one of two placed trird Semi-Finals drivers with better result in Progression Round.

Final

Standings after the event 

Source

 Note: Only the top five positions are included.

References 

|- style="text-align:center"
|width="35%"|Previous race:2022 World RX of Benelux
|width="40%"|FIA World Rallycross Championship2022 season
|width="35%"|Next race:2022 World RX of Germany
|- style="text-align:center"
|width="35%"|Previous race:2021 World RX of Barcelona-Catalunya
|width="40%"|World RX of Catalunya
|width="35%"|Next race:-
|- style="text-align:center"

Catalunya
World RX, Barcelona
World RX